BroadwaySF is a commercial theatrical production company in San Francisco. It was founded in 1977 by Broadway producers Carole Shorenstein Hays and Robert Nederlander as Shorenstein Hays Nederlander Theatres (Later abbreviated to SHN) as a promoter of short engagements of national touring productions of plays and musicals.  BroadwaySF owns and operates two historic theatres in San Francisco:  the Orpheum and Golden Gate Theatres; and previously operated the Curran Theatre until 2014.  BroadwaySF also consults on the Broadway series at the AT&T Performing Arts Center in Dallas.

On October 1, 2019, SHN changed its name to BroadwaySF in the aftermath of a lawsuit between itself and founder Hays, who had given up an active role in the organization.  Hays continued to hold a 50% stake in SHN until then, when she gave up her stake as a part of the settlement.

Notable productions
BroadwaySF has hosted the world premieres and pre-Broadway engagements of numerous shows including:  Wicked, Mamma Mia!, Baz Luhrmann's La Bohème, the 2006 revival of A Chorus Line, Legally Blonde The Musical, and a new musical stage version of Irving Berlin's White Christmas.  BroadwaySF engagements have kicked off the national tours of Jersey Boys, Spring Awakening, the Lincoln Center revival of Rodgers and Hammerstein's South Pacific, Avenue Q, Edward Scissorhands, and The Light in the Piazza, all immediately following their Broadway runs.  BroadwaySF has presented the West Coast premieres of Caroline, or Change, I Am My Own Wife, Spamalot, The Color Purple, and the Pulitzer Prize winning play August: Osage County.

Wicked returned to San Francisco playing a two-year run, Jersey Boys, The Lion King, and Les Misérables each played for over a year, while The Phantom of the Opera broke records with a five-year run.

References
Notes

External links
Official website
Broadway Theater in San Francisco

Companies based in San Francisco